Atwood Lake is a reservoir located in Tuscarawas and Carroll counties in east central Ohio. The lake is named for the community of Atwood  which was purchased, demolished and inundated. Evidence of an old rail station and roadbed can also be seen near Dellroy when the lake level is drawn down for winter. In addition to the Indian Fork the lake also has coves to the north up Elliott Run, Willow Run and two unnamed streams along Bark Road and Ohio State Route 542. The dam was completed in September 1936 at a cost of $1,403,900 by the Muskingum Watershed Conservancy District. The operation of the lake and dam, along with the property immediately surrounding the dam site, was transferred to the U.S. Army Corps of Engineers, Huntington District, after the approval of the Flood Control Act of 1939 by Congress. The MWCD continues to be responsible for the management of much of the reservoir areas behind the dam, serving as a partner to the U.S. Army Corps of Engineers for flood reduction. In addition to operating a number of recreation facilities, the MWCD cooperates with the Ohio Division of Wildlife for fishing and hunting management.

Atwood Dam

Spillway
Uncontrolled chute spillway near left (south) abutment, crest elevation 941 ft, length of crest 95 ft, design discharge  with surcharge of 12 ft and freeboard of 2 ft.

Outlet Works

Intake structure: Three 3.5 ft x 7 ft gated conduits through south abutment and a stilling basin. To maintain minimum pool, a 1.5 ft diameter siphon is located in each of the two outer conduits, in front of the gates and discharges into the middle conduit below the gate. Invert elevation siphon 927.25.Other Structures:  None.Maximum flow of record at the dam site:  (01-22-1959)Reservoir design flood peak flow: 

Levels above normal can cause road closures near the lake. In November of each year the lake is lowered to winter pool of 923 feet to allow more flood capacity, and to freeze and kill the roots of aquatic weeds. Levels are returned to summer pool in the spring.

Recreation
A public boat launch ramp is located near the dam.  The lake has  of shoreline.  Fish live in the lake. Atwood Lake Park has beach and camping, and other facilities.  The Alive Festival is scheduled for the park.

Atwood Lake Marina
Atwood Lake Marina has east and west locations where boats can be rented.

Atwood Lake Resort and Conference Center
The Atwood Lake Resort and Conference Center, with nine hole par-3 and 18-hole championship golf courses, was built in 1965. The MWCD  transferred ownership of the property to Carroll County on February 10, 2012. The resort closed in March 2016 due to financial problems.

The facility was sold to Billy Burns in January 2017. Burns announced plans to develop a drug and alcohol treatment center named The Bluffs in the former resort.

Atwood Yacht Club
Atwood Yacht Club is a private club on the south shore of the lake.

References

External links
Carroll County Visitor's Bureau
Muskingum Watershed Conservancy District

Reservoirs in Ohio
Bodies of water of Carroll County, Ohio
Bodies of water of Tuscarawas County, Ohio
Dams in Ohio
Muskingum Watershed Conservancy District
United States Army Corps of Engineers, Huntington District
Tourist attractions in Carroll County, Ohio
Tourist attractions in Tuscarawas County, Ohio